The Zomi Revolutionary Army (abbreviated ZRA) is an armed Zomi nationalist insurgent group formed in 1997, following an increase in ethnic tensions between the Kuki people (i.e. the Thadou) and the Paites tribe in Churachandpur district of Manipur, India. Its parent organisation, the Zomi Revolutionary Organisation, was founded in April 1993. Pu K Guite, a Zomi leader from Karbi Anglong (Mikir Hills of Assam), is the founder president of the organisation.It is one of the most powerful group operation in Manipur.

The ZRA's proclaimed objective is to "protect the interests of the Zo ethnic groups" and to "unite the Zomi peoples under one state, Zogam", which overlaps the official state boundaries of India (Manipur and Mizoram), Myanmar (Chin State) and Bangladesh (Chittagong Hill Tracts).

Leadership 
The ZRA has three main leadership positions, President, General Secretary, and Information and Publicity Secretary. Most of its leadership are from the Zomi community. Its current leaders are:
 Thanglianpau Guite, President of the Zomi Revolutionary Army
 D. Kamsuanthang, General Secretary
 Jimmy Suanpu, Information and Publicity Secretary

Areas of operation 
The ZRA mainly conducts operations in the Paite, Simte, Vaiphei, Zou, Mizo, Chin, Gangte, Thadou and other tribes under Zo umbrella majority areas of the Churachandpur district in Manipur and other districts in Manipur, particularly the Singngat subdivision near Myanmar (Burma). Their main operation areas includes bordering regions of Manipur and Mizoram, and also in Chin State, Myanmar (Burma).

Funding 
The ZRA allegedly funds itself through the collection of "protection fees" from locals who live in their areas of operations. In exchange for this fee, the ZRA claims they protect locals from being shot, kidnapped, or robbed by rival groups. In June 2004, according to local media reports, the ZRA accused the Mizo National Front (MNF) administration in Mizoram of only partially paying ZRA cadres for campaigning on behalf of MNF candidates in Champhai. A prominent opposition leader in Mizoram, Lal Thanhawla, claimed that on 12 June 2004, the MNF owed the ZRA payment for "services rendered", and that, because the MNF had failed to pay, the ZRA had begun collecting fees from residents of Mizoram.

Alliances with other groups 
The ZRA's maintains close alliances with the Kanglei Yawol Kanna Lup (KYKL) and the National Socialist Council of Nagaland-Isak Muivah (NSCN-IM). The group also has a memorandum of understanding with the Kuki Liberation Organization (KLO) that promises "full cooperation in all spheres, with the objective of strengthening the blood ties among the Kuki-Chin-Mizo/Zomi peoples". The ZRA was once in conflict with the Hmar People's Convention-Democracy (HPC-D), but the two groups reached an agreement to "work closely in the spirit of mutual understanding and cooperation for the welfare of the people and for achieving their shared objectives".

Peace negotiations 
On 9 August 2005, the ZRA released a statement, saying that they had reached a ceasefire agreement with the Indian government, which was to last for six months starting from 1 August. The ZRA also said that they had "viewed the steps taken by the Indian government in this regard as a positive approach towards the better understanding of our unique history, and the realisation of the need for a permanent solution to the long standing aspirations of the Zomi people". In spite of this agreement, the Indian security forces allegedly conducted operations against ZRA during the ceasefire.

Notable incidents 

 On 9 June 2005, ZRA insurgents ambushed a truck in Churachandpur district carrying Zomi Revolutionary Front (ZRF) insurgents, killing three ZRF members and one civilian. This attack was in retaliation for the ZRF's defection from the ZRA.
 On 20 September 2005, ZRA insurgents clashed with other insurgents belonging to the Zomi Revolutionary Front, resulting in six deaths; one ZRA activist was also injured.
 On 20 August 2006, two civilians were killed and four others were injured after Indian security forces opened fire on a group of churchgoers in the Vengnuam subdivision of Churachandpur, the ZRA's stronghold, believing incorrectly that ZRA members were present.
 On 10 January 2010, three ZRA insurgents were killed in a clash with insurgents belonging to the People's Liberation Army of Manipur, in Tonzang Township, Chin State. Large numbers of PLA was also eliminated. 
 On 15 January 2010, two ZRA insurgents were killed in a clash with insurgents belonging the Revolutionary People's Front, the armed faction of the People's Liberation Army of Manipur operating in interior Manipur.

References

External links 
 National Consortium for the Study of Terrorism and Responses to Terrorism
 South Asia Terrorism Portal
 Zomi Re-Unification Organization

Paramilitary organisations based in Myanmar
Terrorism in India
Separatism in Myanmar
Separatism in India
Separatism in Bangladesh
Rebel groups in Myanmar
Rebel groups in India